The Galas by-election was an election for the Galas seat in the Kelantan state legislative assembly to replace the incumbent, who died in office. Polling was held on 4 November 2010. Nominations were held on 26 October 2010. The Galas state seat fell vacant following the death of assemblyman Che Hashim Sulaiman on 27 September due to cancer. Previously, PAS won the seat during the 2008 General Election by a 646-vote majority over Barisan Nasional's Saufi Deraman.
 A total 11,553 registered voters were eligible to vote in this by-election, including 127 postal voters. The electorate is made of 61.63% Malays, 20.08% Chinese, 16.37% Orang Asli, 1.6% Indians, 0.09% others. Barisan Nasional's candidate won the by-election.

Results

References 

2010
2010 elections in Malaysia
Elections in Kelantan